La fabulosa guitarra de Paco de Lucía (The Fabulous Guitar of Paco de Lucía) is the first solo studio album by Paco de Lucía.

Track listing
"Gitanos Trianeros" – 3:42
"Llanto a Cádiz" – 3:27
"Recuerdo a Patiño” – 3:08
"Punta Umbría" – 3:24
"Jerezana" – 3:02
"Viva La Unión" – 4:42
"Llora la siguiriya" – 3:16
"En la caleta" – 3:23
"Impetu" by Mario Escudero – 2:57
"El Tajo" – 3:33

Musicians
Paco de Lucía – Flamenco guitar

References
 Gamboa, Manuel José and Nuñez, Faustino. (2003). Paco de Lucía. Madrid: Universal Music Spain.

1967 albums
Paco de Lucía albums
PolyGram albums